Henry Montagu Butler (2 July 1833 – 14 January 1918) was an English academic and clergyman, who served as headmaster of Harrow School (1860–85), Dean of Gloucester (1885–86) and Master of Trinity College, Cambridge (1886–1918).

Early life
Butler was the fourth son of George Butler, Headmaster of Harrow School and later Dean of Peterborough, and his wife Sarah Maria .

He was educated at Harrow and Trinity College, Cambridge, matriculating in 1851. At Cambridge he won the Browne Medal in 1853 and 1854, the Camden Medal, and the Porson Prize in 1854, and was President of the Cambridge Union for Michaelmas term 1855. He graduated B.A. as senior classic in 1855, M.A. 1858, D.D. 1865.

Made a Fellow of Trinity in 1855, Butler was a tutor there 1855–1859. He was ordained deacon and priest in 1859.

Career
As his father had, Butler served as headmaster of Harrow School (1860 to 1885).  As headmaster, he influenced many young people, including Stanley Baldwin (Prime Minister), Lord Davidson (Archbishop of Canterbury), Galsworthy of the Forsyte Saga, 10 bishops including Bishop Gore, 17 judges, 4 viceroys, 12 governors, 12 ambassadors, 33 privy councillors, and 64 generals.  He changed Harrow from a hide-bound and backward seventeenth century institution to a rebuilt and well-equipped contemporary school.

He was then appointed Dean of Gloucester in 1885 and was also Master of Trinity College, Cambridge from 1886 to 1918, and Vice Chancellor of the University, 1889–1890.

A talented and versatile Latinist, Butler achieved fame as one of the most adept British composers of Latin (and Greek) verse in the 19th and 20th centuries. He wrote one hymn, Lift up your hearts! We lift them, Lord, to thee in 1881. He died in Cambridge on 14 January 1918.

Trivia
Shane Leslie described him as "the Master of Trinity, a bland Olympian in a black skull-cap with a white Jovine beard and an untiring flow of the lengthy anecdotes that are told in Heaven after the nectar has gone round twice.”

Butler's desk was donated to Duke Hospital by Dr. William John Dann in March 1938. After it had been moved to storage, circumstances led the school to refinish it and hence to discover the plaque telling of its historical significance.

Henry Montagu Butler was the first cousin once removed to Montagu Christie Butler, with whom he may easily be confused if either is referred to simply as "Montagu Butler". He was also the brother of schoolmaster George Butler, whose wife was the social reformer Josephine Butler, and the great-uncle of Richard Austen 'Rab' Butler, who also became Master of Trinity.

A. C. Benson recounted how Butler fell asleep during a College meeting and awoke with the emphatic observation, "A strong case, tellingly put".

Family
Butler married twice. Firstly, on 19 December 1861, to Georgina Isabella Elliot (1839–1883), with issue:
Agnes Isabel Butler (1865–1949), married Edmund Whytehead Howson
Edward Montagu Butler (1866–1948), first-class cricketer and father of Olympic gold medallist Guy Montagu Butler
Edith Violet Butler (1869–1887)
Arthur Hugh Montagu Butler (1873–1943), House of Lords Librarian
Gertrude Maud Butler (1880–1933), married Bernard Morley-Fletcher

Secondly, in August 1888 at St George's, Hanover Square, aged 55, Butler married Agnata Frances Ramsay (1867–1931), a 21-year-old classicist who in 1887 attained the highest marks in the Classical Tripos at Cambridge. They had issue:
Sir James Ramsay Montagu Butler (1889–1975), politician
Gordon Kerr Montagu Butler (1891–1916), killed in action in the First World War
Sir Nevile Montagu Butler (1893–1973), diplomat

Notes

References

The Master of Trinity at Trinity College, Cambridge

1833 births
1918 deaths
Head Masters of Harrow School
People educated at Harrow School
Alumni of Trinity College, Cambridge
Masters of Trinity College, Cambridge
People from Gayton, Northamptonshire
Vice-Chancellors of the University of Cambridge
Deans of Gloucester
Presidents of the Cambridge Union
Henry